Gordon Gino and Fred: Road Trip is a British travel and food show that originally aired on the ITV and ITV HD in United Kingdom. In it, chefs Gordon Ramsay, Gino D'Acampo and master maitre d' Fred Sirieix visit various countries and cities, where they explore local culture and cuisine. The first series premiered on 11 October 2018, the second series called Gordon Gino & Fred: American Road Trip premiered on 2 April 2020 and the third series called Gordon Gino & Fred Go Greek premiered 27 September 2021, to a shortened run of only two episodes.

In some countries outside the United Kingdom the first series of the show is known as: Gordon, Gino & Fred: The Ultimate Road Trip.

On 10 December 2020, ITV commissioned a further three series and three Christmas specials of Gordon Gino and Fred: Road Trip; series 3 (2021) (6 x 60′), series 4 (2022) (8 x 60′), and series 5 (2023) (8 x 60′).

Series overview

Episodes

Christmas Special (2017)

Series 1 (2018)

Christmas Special (2019) (Morocco)

Series 2: American Road Trip (2020)

Christmas Special (2020) (Finland)

Series 3: Go Greek! (2021)

Gordon, Gino and Fred: Unseen Bits (2022)

International edits & variations

USA 
The Fox network has aired a number of compressed, special versions of the show, rebadged under the Gordon Ramsay's Road Trip umbrella. On January 5, 2021, Fox aired a condensed, two-hour compilation of series 2, American Road Trip, entitled Gordon Ramsay's American Road Trip. On December 13, 2021, they broadcast a similarly-compressed, two-hour version of series 1, entitled Gordon Ramsay's Road Trip: European Vacation, and on December 14, a one-hour version of the 2020 Christmas special aired, entitled Gordon Ramsay's Road Trip: Christmas Vacation. On January 4, 2022, they broadcast Gordon Ramsay's Road Trip: Greek Vacation, adapted from the third series of the British run.

Home media 
Series 1 of Gordon, Gino and Fred: Road Trip (including the Christmas special: Christmas Road Trip: Three Unwise Men) was released on DVD in the United Kingdom on 4 November 2019. Series 2 DVD was released in the United Kingdom on 22 June 2020.

References

External links

2017 British television series debuts
2010s British cooking television series
2020s British cooking television series
2010s British travel television series
2020s British travel television series
English-language television shows
Food travelogue television series
British cooking television shows
ITV (TV network) original programming
Television series by All3Media